Diljalaa is a  1987 Indian Hindi-language crime drama film, starring Jackie Shroff, Farah in lead roles. It was written by Vinay Shukla and directed by director Bapu. The music was composed by Bappi Lahiri.

Plot 
Widowed, multi-millionaire Sharda (Tanuja) lives with his only son, Munna (Jackie Shroff). She is also the proprietor of a factory called "Sharda Chemicals". Munna is in love with Mamta (Farah), the only daughter of Gupta (Danny Denzongpa), the general manager of "Sharda Chemicals". Sharda arranges Munna's marriage with Mamta, who is currently pursuing studies at Lovedale College in Manori. On the day of the engagement, Mamta insults her father, Munna and Sharda in the presence of a huge gathering. Thus the marriage plans get cancelled. Then several children get killed after receiving a poisonous vaccine manufactured and marketed by "Sharda Chemicals", prompting the police to arrest Sharda, who is convicted of the crime in court. Sharda becomes senseless in court and died in hospital. Eventually, Munna is killed by Gupta, along with his friends; Mittal (Rajesh Puri), Mehra (Narendranath), Radhe (Gurbachan Singh), Shyam (Sudhir Pandey), who take over his family's assets, thus renaming the factory, "Friends Chemicals". Gupta then arranges to get Mamta married to Azaad Modi (Satish Shah), the only son of wealthy Mrs. Modi (Sushma Seth), but before the marriage, Mamta gets pregnant by a male in disguise of Azaad, prompting Mrs. Modi to cancel the wedding plans, while on the other hand, Gupta began to face many challenges in business due to a man, who calls himself as Inspector Panchmarg Koda. Relatively unknown to Gupta and his friends that Inspector Panchmarg Koda and the male, who disguises Azaad, is none other than Munna himself, who survives and is out to destroy them one after the other.

Cast
Jackie Shroff as Munna / Inspector Panchmarg Koda / Azaad Modi
Farah as Mamta
Tanuja as Sharda 
Danny Denzongpa as Mr. Gupta 
Narendranath as Mr. Mehra
Rajesh Puri as Mr. Mittal
Gurbachan Singh as Radhe
Sudhir Pandey as Shyam
Romesh Sharma as Madan Pancholi
Annu Kapoor as Baba
Sushma Seth as Mrs. Modi
Satish Shah as Azaad Modi

Soundtrack
Kavi Pradeep wrote only two versions of "Mere Munna, Mere Chanda", the rest of the songs were written by Indeevar.

External links

1987 films
1980s crime action films
1987 crime drama films
1980s action drama films
Indian crime action films
Indian crime drama films
Indian action drama films
Films directed by Bapu
Films scored by Bappi Lahiri
1980s Hindi-language films